Emilie Christensen (born 13 April 1993) is a Norwegian handball player for Molde Elite.

She also represented Norway in the 2011 Women's Junior European Handball Championship, placing 12th.

Achievements
World Championship:
Silver Medalist: 2017
Norwegian League:
Bronze Medalist: 2015/2016, 2016/2017
Silver Medalist: 2014/2015
Norwegian Cup:
Silver Medalist: 2016
World Youth Championship:
Silver Medalist: 2010

Individual awards
 All-Star Line Centre Back of Grundigligaen: 2016/2017

References

Norwegian female handball players
1993 births
Living people
People from Os, Hordaland
Sportspeople from Vestland